Littlemore railway station was  on the Wycombe Railway and served Littlemore in Oxfordshire. Littlemore was then a village but is now a suburb of Oxford.

The Wycombe Railway opened the station in 1864 as part of its extension from Thame to Oxford.

In 1963 British Railways withdrew passenger services between Princes Risborough and Oxford and closed all intermediate stations including Littlemore. The line through Littlemore remains open for freight traffic between the Didcot - Oxford main line at Kennington Junction and the BMW Mini factory at Cowley.

In November 2014 Chiltern Railways ran a train filled with investors and local businessmen along the track to a temporary station at Oxford Science Park, signalling the possibility of a station in Littlemore by 2020.

Route

References

Disused railway stations in Oxfordshire
Former Great Western Railway stations
Railway stations in Great Britain opened in 1864
Railway stations in Great Britain closed in 1963